Ausia (اوسیاہ ) is a village in the Union council of Dewal, Murree Tehsil (مری), Murree District, Pakistan. It borders Union Councils of Rawat, Phagwari & Malkot. It is located on Upper Kohala Road at 33°59'0N .73°28'0E at an altitude of 1712 meters (5620). Ausia's boundary starts from (Passi(Kurhbagla)New-shakkarparyaan) spotting Murree-Meridian Marriage Hall, from where the road starts its descent down towards the core village (ranging towards Kohala & other northern areas, a crossing point into Kashmir) and spreads up to 'Peida' near ex-PM of Pakistan Shahid Khaqan Abbasi's residence & here the next model village 'Dewal' situated in the same UC initiates.

Beyond Murree, it was the only place to have a Government Higher Secondary School since 1885, which was later upgraded to a college.  The School remained the sole educational institution catering to the people of lower union councils of Murree for a long time. As of 2019 there are many primary and secondary government and private schools for both genders.

A main road links Ausia with Malkot (Hazara/KP) leads further to Ayubia & Abbotabad. Another link road, Ausia-Dehla Road, connects the Upper Kohala Road with the Lower Kohala Road(Phagwari, Alyot, Topa) starts from the main bazaar of Ausia, called 'Parao'.

During the (British Raj), the 'Parao' served as a resting place for the troops, including high command, en route to Kashmir & India. Here's situated the 'Grand Jamia Mosque Ausia'(Murree's 1st grand mosque comprising a vast space for a number of Namazis). This spacious Masjid is being rebuilt with generous contributions from the residents.

The Ausia bazar (Parao, Makkah Chowk, Malkot Chowk, Chatti) offers hotel/workshop/catering services. Adjacent to the bazar are numerous private/ government schools & colleges and also 2 playgrounds (one at Parao & the other at Dara/Baagh en'route Makkah chowk) which host certain sporting/gaming events not only for the locals but also for the outsiders. Summers are pleasant as the weather is moderate most of the time & the inhabitants enjoy consuming indingenous fruits & veggies. The winters are often very cold with constant rain, hail & snow. Ausia is about 20–25 minutes drive from Murree under normal conditions.

Notable people 

 Nadeem Abbasi, Former Test Cricketer Pakistan National Team (1989)
 Javed Malik, Prime Minister's Special Envoy for Foreign Investment

References

Union councils of Murree Tehsil
Populated places in Murree Tehsil